Fannie Ernestine Motley (January 25, 1927 - May 8, 2016) was the first African-American graduate from Spring Hill College, a Jesuit institution in Mobile, Alabama. She entered the school in 1954.

Biography 
Motley was raised in Monroeville, Alabama. She enrolled in college shortly after the 1954 Brown vs. Board of Education decision.

Years before George Wallace attempted to block integration of the University of Alabama, Motley became the first black student to graduate from Spring Hill College, the Jesuit school in Mobile, Alabama, in 1956. The moment was documented in The New York Times, Jet and Time.

Motley came to Cincinnati in 1963 when her husband was pastor of Peace Baptist Church. She taught for 24 years in the Cincinnati Public School system. In 1969 she earned a master's degree in guidance counseling from Xavier University.

She has a chair in her living room with a sign on it that says, "Martin Luther King Jr. sat in this chair at our house, October 10, 1964."

A scholarship has been created in her name at Spring Hill College.

Family
Her husband was D. L. Motley Sr., a pastor. She has two sons who are pastors in Jeffersonville, Indiana, and Atlanta, Georgia.

When her husband died in 2001 she moved to Jeffersonville, Indiana. Motley died in Fairburn, Georgia, on Mother's Day 2016 and was interred at Vine Street Hill Cemetery in Cincinnati. Mrs. Motley's brother was minister and civil rights activist, the Rev. Nelson "Fireball" Smith.

References

External links
Ceremony at Spring Hill College
The Fannie Motley Endowed Scholarship
The Montgomery Advertiser-Journal, June 1956
The New York Times, Wednesday, May 30, 1956
Bio on Xavier
Fannie Motley article, Encyclopedia of Alabama.

Schoolteachers from Ohio
Educators from Cincinnati
People from Jeffersonville, Indiana
1930s births
2016 deaths
Spring Hill College alumni
People from Monroeville, Alabama
African-American people
American women educators
21st-century American women
Burials at Vine Street Hill Cemetery